Harmelen is a town in the Dutch province of Utrecht. It is a part of the municipality of Woerden, and lies about 6 km east of Woerden.

In 2001, the town of Harmelen had 6557 inhabitants. The built-up area of the town was 1.11 km², and contained 2481 residences.

Harmelen is on the railway line between Utrecht and Woerden; its train station was opened on 21 May 1855 and closed on 15 May 1936. In 1962, two passenger trains collided near Harmelen. The Harmelen train disaster, resulting in 93 fatalities, was the largest train accident in Dutch history.

The village used to be a separate municipality, until it merged with Woerden in 2001. Before the merger the municipality of Harmelen had about 8000 inhabitants.

Notable people born in Harmelen 
 Ellen van Dijk, (born 1987) –  professional racing cyclist
 Dico Koppers, (born 1992) – soccerplayer by Ajax
 Theo de Rooij, (born 1957) – former racing cyclist and manager of the Rabobank cycling team
 James Cornelius van Miltenburg, (born 1909) – first Archbishop of Karachi

References

Municipalities of the Netherlands disestablished in 2001
Populated places in Utrecht (province)
Former municipalities of Utrecht (province)
Woerden